Shraddhakar Supakar (14 September 1914 – 5 January 1993) was a social activist, politician and writer. He was a member of Odisha Legislative Assembly, Lok Sabha and Rajya Sabha. Supakar was a lawyer by profession. He was associated in different capacities with many educational institutions and Universities. He was also a member of Odisha Text Book Committee during 1939–41. A firm believer in civil liberties, Supakar was Chairman of Reception Committee, All India Civil Liberties Conference, Cuttack Session held in 1954.

Shraddhakar Supakar was an elected member of Odisha Legislative Assembly during 1952-56 and 1985-1990 representing Rairakhol and Sambalpur constituency. He served as Leader of Opposition during 1952-56 and as pro tem speaker in 1985. He was an elected member of the Second and Fourth Lok Sabha during 1957-62 and 1967-70 representing Sambalpur constituency of Odisha. He was also a member of Rajya Sabha during 1965–67.

References

1914 births
1993 deaths
People from Sambalpur district
Leaders of the Opposition in Odisha
Rajya Sabha members from Odisha
Lok Sabha members from Odisha
Indian National Congress politicians
India MPs 1957–1962
India MPs 1967–1970
Indian National Congress politicians from Odisha
Odia-language writers
Writers from Odisha
Recipients of the Odisha Sahitya Akademi Award
20th-century Indian male writers